Liechtenstein competed at the 1998 Winter Olympics in Nagano, Japan.

Alpine skiing

Men

Men's combined

Women

Women's combined

Cross-country skiing

Men

1 Starting delay based on 10 km results. 
C = Classical style, F = Freestyle

References
Official Olympic Reports
 Olympic Winter Games 1998, full results by sports-reference.com

Nations at the 1998 Winter Olympics
1998
W